is a Japanese variety show. It premiered on October 18, 2005, and ended on September 10, 2013, and aired on TBS every Tuesday night. Hosted by the comedy duo Downtown, it featured seven other comedians in its regular cast, and had several recurring younger, up-and-coming comedians as guests. 

The show used Abraham Lincoln as its mascot, and its slogan was: "The program of the geinin, by the geinin, for the geinin", parodying a line from his famous Gettysburg Address. The object of the show was to have the younger comedians watch and learn from the more experienced comedians through fun and games.

The opening used the song "The Revolution" by BT and featured the regular cast as superheroic anime characters in a futuristic setting. The animation was done by Studio 4°C, a studio well known for The Animatrix.

Cast

Regulars
 Downtown (Masatoshi Hamada and Hitoshi Matsumoto)
 Summers (Kazuki Ōtake and Masakazu Mimura)
 Ameagari Kesshitai (Hiroyuki Miyasako and Tōru Hotohara)
 Kyaeen (Udo Suzuki and Hiroyuki Amano)

Semi-regulars
 Tomomitsu Yamaguchi
 Ogi Yahagi
 Jichō Kachō
 Shinagawa Shoji
 Speed Wagon
 Nakagawa-ke
 Bananaman
 Fujiwara
 Football Hour

External links
 

2010s Japanese television series
2005 Japanese television series debuts
2013 Japanese television series endings
Japanese variety television shows
TBS Television (Japan) original programming